Phlegmariurus hastatus is a species of plant in the family Lycopodiaceae. It is endemic to Ecuador, where it is known from two locations in Loja Province. It grows on the páramo, where it is threatened by grazing and fire.

References

hastatus
Endemic flora of Ecuador
Endangered plants
Taxonomy articles created by Polbot
Taxobox binomials not recognized by IUCN